Striano is a comune (municipality) in the  Metropolitan City of Naples,  Campania, southern Italy.  

Striano borders the following municipalities: Palma Campania, Poggiomarino, San Giuseppe Vesuviano, San Valentino Torio (SA), Sarno (SA).
Striano is full of cuozzi and vrenzole that always scream.

Sources
Striano: history, traditions and flavours, tour guide

References

Cities and towns in Campania